Vernou-la-Celle-sur-Seine is a commune in the Seine-et-Marne department in the Île-de-France region in north-central France.

Vernou-la-Celle-sur-Seine is the twin town to Manorbier, in Pembrokeshire, South West Wales, and was twinned in 1981.

Demographics
Inhabitants of Vernou-la-Celle-sur-Seine are called Vernoucellois.

Buildings
The notable buildings of the commune include the Château d'Argeville.

See also
Communes of the Seine-et-Marne department

References

External links

Official site 
1999 Land Use, from IAURIF (Institute for Urban Planning and Development of the Paris-Île-de-France région) 

Communes of Seine-et-Marne
Seine-et-Marne communes articles needing translation from French Wikipedia